Gérard Perrier (5 January 1928 – 11 October 2012) was a French cross-country skier who competed in the 1940s and in the 1950s. In 1948 he was a member of the French relay team which finished seventh in the 4 x 10 km relay. Four years later he finished 25th in the 18 km event at the 1952 Winter Olympics in Oslo.

References

External links
18 km Olympic cross country results: 1948-52

Olympic cross-country skiers of France
Cross-country skiers at the 1948 Winter Olympics
Cross-country skiers at the 1952 Winter Olympics
French male cross-country skiers
1928 births
2012 deaths
20th-century French people